The Pakistan cricket team toured the West Indies from 14 July to 28 July 2013. The tour consisted of five One Day International and two Twenty20 International matches. The tour was initially to have included two Test matches, but the scheduling of a triangular series by the West Indies with India and Sri Lanka shortened the available window for the tour. The West Indies Cricket Board had asked the Pakistan Cricket Board to postpone the tour to August, but that interfered with Pakistan's plans to host India and complete a series against Zimbabwe that had been postponed from 2012.

In the first ODI game, Pakistan spinner Shahid Afridi finished with figures of 7/12, the second best ODI bowling figures of all time.

Squads

Tour Matches

Guyana vs Pakistanis

ODI series

1st ODI

2nd ODI

3rd ODI

4th ODI

5th ODI

T20I series

1st T20I

2nd T20I

Broadcasting Rights

References

External links

2013 in Pakistani cricket
2013 in West Indian cricket
Pakistani cricket tours of the West Indies
International cricket competitions in 2013
West Indian cricket seasons from 2000–01